This is list of members of the Argentine Chamber of Deputies from 10 December 2011 to 9 December 2013.

Composition

By province

By political groups
as of 9 December 2013

Election cycles

List of Deputies

Notes

References

External links
List of deputies in the official website (archived)

2011
2011 in Argentina
2012 in Argentina
2013 in Argentina